Richardson, Duck and Company was a shipbuilding company in Thornaby-on-Tees, England that traded between 1855 and 1925.

History
The yard was founded as the South Stockton Iron Ship Building Co in 1852. Its premises were the former yard of engine builders Fossick of Stockton and its first vessel was the iron-hulled steamship Advance. In 1855 Joseph Richardson and George Nixon Duck took over the yard. They built fifty iron steamships, a paddle steamer, ten sailing ships and 29 barges in their first ten years. In 1859 they built the paddle steamer Tasmanian Maid (yard no. 9) which in 1863 was converted into the gunboat .

In 1859 Richardson, Duck took over the Rake Kimber yard at Middlesbrough. They built about 11 vessels at Middlesbrough and then sold the yard to Backhouse and Dixon in 1862. In 1870 Richardson, Duck built  (yard no. 160) which in 1884 was re-engined with a triple-expansion engine made by Blair & Co of Stockton-on-Tees. In 1893 the company built the German merchant ship SS Athen.

In the 1900s Richardson, Duck started building steel hulls. By the end of that decade Richardson, Duck had built five hundred tramp steamers, other merchant ships and lighters. It had also become licensees for the Isherwood system of longitudinal framing.

In 1912 Richardson, Duck built 12 ships and became a limited liability company.
 
In the First World War the yard built the Arabis-class sloop  (yard no. 661) and Aubrietia-class sloop  (yard no. 666). It also built a further dozen tramp steamers, eight standard War "A" tramps and a standard "AO" tanker.

In 1919 Richardson, Duck became a public company and in 1920 James and Walter Gould acquired a controlling interest in it. In 1922 the yard suffered industrial action and a lack of orders. In May 1925 the Gould Group went into liquidation and in 1933 the yard was demolished.

References

Defunct shipbuilding companies of the United Kingdom
Thornaby-on-Tees
Teesside
Manufacturing companies established in 1855
Manufacturing companies disestablished in 1925
1855 establishments in England
1925 disestablishments in England
British companies established in 1855